Lycée Fustel de Coulanges may refer to:
  (France)
 Lycée Français Fustel de Coulanges (Yaoundé, Cameroon)